The Western Corridor Recycled Water Scheme, a recycled water project, is located in the South East region of Queensland in Australia. The scheme is managed by Seqwater and forms a key part of the SEQ Water Grid constructed by the Queensland Government in response to population growth, climate change and severe drought. The 2.5 billion project is reported as the largest recycled water project in Australia. As of 2019, the scheme has been constructed and its performance has been validated. It remains in care and maintenance mode, and will commence operation after SEQ Water Grid dam levels reach 60%.

Location and features
The Western Corridor is the area from Brisbane's south west suburbs towards the city of Ipswich. For many years the corridor has experienced significant population growth with the development of the suburb of Springfield and the resultant extension of the Centenary Highway and the upgrade to the Ipswich Motorway.

The treatment train consists of microfiltration, reverse osmosis, ultraviolet light with advanced oxidation and chlorine disinfection. 

Construction began on the Recycled Water Project in 2006 and completed in late 2008. 408 million of funding was provided by the Australian Government via its Water Smart Australia Program.

In Stage 1 of the project the scheme has provided an alternative water source for Swanbank Power Station and both Tarong Power Station and Tarong North Power Station. Supplies to Swanbank started in 2007 and supplies to Tarong and Tarong North started in June 2008. This supply has since ceased.

The system has the capacity to provide water to other industrial users, agricultural users and to supplement drinking water supplies in Wivenhoe Dam. Testing of the pipeline to Wivenhoe Dam has been conducted, however in November 2008, Premier Anna Bligh declared that recycled water will not enter the dam unless levels drop to below 40%.

In January 2013 it was reported that the Newman government was considering shutting down part or all of the scheme.

The scheme was decommissioned on 31 March 2015 after sufficient rainfall forestalled immediate water security concerns.

See also

Bradfield Scheme
Goldfields Water Supply Scheme
Irrigation in Australia
Swanbank Power Station

References

External links
Seqwater
Bureau of Meteorology

Water management in Queensland
South East Queensland
2008 establishments in Australia
Water treatment
Infrastructure in Australia
Infrastructure in Queensland